The Artot–Alard Stradivarius of 1728 is an antique violin made by luthier Antonio Stradivari of Cremona (1644-1736).

This violin is currently on display in the Stradivarius exhibition at the Musical Instrument Museum in Phoenix, Arizona until June 5, 2016.

See also
Stradivarius
List of Stradivarius instruments

External links
 

1728 works
Stradivari violins
Stradivari instruments